Statistics of the 1984 Cameroonian Premier League season.

Overview
Tonnerre Yaoundé won the championship.

References
Cameroon 1984 - List of final tables (RSSSF)

1984 in Cameroonian football
Cam
Cam
Elite One seasons